Vũ Như Thành  (born 28 August 1981) is a Vietnamese professional football coach and former player. He is currently the manager of V.League 2 club Phu Tho.

He was a member of the Vietnam national football team.

He has won two V-League titles with Bình Dương. In 2009, he has won the silver ball award.

Honours

Vietnam
AFC Asian Cup
Quarter-finals 2007 AFC Asian Cup
ASEAN Football Championship
Champion: 2008
Third Place: 2007

Bình Dương

V-League
Champion: 2007, 2008
Runner-up: 2006, 2009

International goals
Scores and results list Vietnam's goal tally first, score column indicates score after each Nhu Thanh goal.

References

External links
 

1981 births
Living people
Vietnamese footballers
Association football central defenders
2007 AFC Asian Cup players
Footballers at the 2002 Asian Games
Becamex Binh Duong FC players
Haiphong FC players
V.League 1 players
Viettel FC players
Asian Games competitors for Vietnam
Vietnam international footballers
Vietnamese football managers